Home's hinge-back tortoise (Kinixys homeana) is a species of tortoise in the family Testudinidae. The species is endemic to Africa.

Etymology
The specific name, homeana, is in honor of English surgeon and naturalist Everard Home.

Geographic range
K. homeana is found in Benin, Cameroon, Democratic Republic of the Congo, Ivory Coast, Equatorial Guinea, Gabon, Ghana, Guinea, Liberia, Nigeria, and possibly Togo.

Habitat
The natural habitats of Home's hinge-back tortoise are subtropical or tropical moist lowland forests, subtropical or tropical swamps, and plantations.

Ecology and life history
Home's hinge-back is naturally attracted to red or pink flowers. It prefers low light and often moves in early morning or dusk, preferring to stay hidden the rest of the day.

Diet
In captivity the diet of K. homeana may include, banana, guava, watermelon, black mushrooms, cooked sweet potato, cooked potato, and cooked or raw squash, and sources of animal protein such as earthworms, mealworms, crickets, snails and fish.

Conservation status
K. homeana is threatened by habitat loss.

References

External links
Reptile Magazine 
Tortoisetrust.org 
Turtle Rescue of Long Island

Further reading
Bell T (1827). "On two new Genera of Land Tortoises". Trans. Linnean Soc. London 15: 392-401 + Plates XVI-XVII. (Kinixys, new genus, p. 398; K. homeana, new species, pp. 400-401 + Plate XVII, figure 2). (in English and Latin).
Boulenger GA (1889). Catalogue of the Chelonians, Rhynchocephalians, and Crocodiles in the British Museum (Natural History). New Edition. London: Trustees of the British Museum (Natural History). (Taylor and Francis, printers). x + 311 pp. + Plates I-VI. (Cinixys homeana, p. 143).

Kinixys
Turtles of Africa
Reptiles described in 1827
Taxonomy articles created by Polbot